This is a list of the municipalities in the state of Alagoas (AL), located in the Northeast Region of Brazil. Alagoas is divided into 102 municipalities, which are grouped into 13 microregions, which are grouped into 3 mesoregions.

See also

Geography of Brazil
List of cities in Brazil

Notes

Alagoas